The United States Air Force's 692nd Intelligence, Surveillance and Reconnaissance Group is an intelligence unit located at Hickam AFB, Hawaii, performing operations as part of the Kunia Regional Security Operations Center (KRSOC).

Mission
The mission of the 692nd Intelligence, Surveillance & Reconnaissance Group is to execute national and tactical ISR operations and missions providing predictive, actionable intelligence for warfighting forces, combatant commanders and national authorities.

Previous designations
692nd Intelligence, Surveillance and Reconnaissance Group (1 Jan 2009 – present)
692nd Intelligence Group (1 May 2005 – ????)
692nd Information Operations Group (1 Aug 2000 – 1 May 2005)
692nd Intelligence Group (1 Oct 1993 – 1 Aug 2000)
692nd Intelligence Wing (1 Oct 1991 – 1 Oct 1993)
Pacific Electronic Security Division (1 Oct 1986 – 1 Oct 1991)
Electronic Security Division, Pacific (24 Oct 1979 – 1 Oct 1986)

Assignments

Major Command/Field Operating Agency/Numbered Air Force
Air Combat Command (ACC) (present)
25 AF (present)
Air Force Intelligence, Surveillance and Reconnaissance Agency (8 Jun 2007 – 2013)
Air Intelligence Agency (1 Oct 1993 – 8 Jun 2007)
Air Force Intelligence Command (1 Oct 1991 – 1 Oct 1993)
Electronic Security Command (1 Nov 1979 – 1 Oct 1991)

Wings/Groups
480th ISR Wing (28 Jun 2006 – present)
67th Intelligence Wing (1 Oct 1993 – 28 Jun 2006)

Squadrons assigned
8th Intelligence Squadron – Hickam AFB, Hawaii 
324th Intelligence Squadron – Hickam AFB, Hawaii 
392nd Intelligence Squadron – Hickam AFB, Hawaii 
792nd Intelligence Support Squadron – Hickam AFB, Hawaii

Bases stationed
Hickam AFB, Hawaii (1 Nov 1979 – present)

Decorations
Air Force Outstanding Unit Award 
1 Jun 2002 – 31 May 2003 (with Combat "Valor" device)
1 Jun 2001 – 31 May 2002
1 Oct 1999-30 Sep 2000
1 Oct 1997 – 30 Sep 1998
1 Oct 1994-30 Sep 1995
1 Oct 1993 – 30 Sep 1994
1 Jul 1991-30 Jun 1993
Air Force Organizational Excellence Award 
1 Jan 1985 – 31 Dec 1986

References

External links
 AF ISR Agency
 Hickam Air Force Base, Hawaii

692
Military units and formations in Hawaii